José Epigmenio Villanueva y Gomez de Eguiarreta (born 1792 in Taxco) was a Mexican clergyman and bishop for the Roman Catholic Archdiocese of Antequera, Oaxaca. He was ordained in 1815. He was appointed bishop in 1839. He died in 1840.

References 

1792 births
1840 deaths
Mexican Roman Catholic bishops
People from Taxco